Mohammadabad-e Kalantar (also Romanized as Moḩammadābād-e Kalāntar; also known as Moḩammadābād) is a village in Ganjabad Rural District, Esmaili District, Anbarabad County, Kerman Province, Iran. At the 2006 census, its population was 150, in 35 families.

References 

Populated places in Anbarabad County